Vaadaa is a 2010 Indian Tamil-language action film directed by A. Venkatesh. The film featured Sundar C. in the lead role, and finally released after several postponements on 15 October 2010.

Plot
Singamuthu aka Singam is a person who lives as a temporary driver in Rishikesh, Uttranchal. Annamalai is the owner of Annamalai Transports but not the building-cum-residence of the transports and the staff. He is very innocent and funny. Annamalai always arranges a marriage bride for himself but in one way or another Singam will stop the marriage. Anjali is an ardent fan of MGR and she feels her husband should also be like him. She is the very beautiful and attractive daughter of the Annamalai Transport building owner and she comes to Rishikesh to check the building's condition and to collect the yearly rent. She meets Singamuthu. and falls in love. Singamuthu also falls in love with Anjali and reveals his past to her. Singamuthu by the real name Vetrivel was a highly accomplished district collector  and was transferred to Tanjore. He gets himself in a cat-and-mouse chase with local goon Naachiyaar. Naachiyaar's son kidnaps Vetrivel's friend's sister who was engaged to another man & tries to rape her. But Vetrivel comes in and saves the girl and destroys Naachiyaar's son's reproductive capacity. Naachiyaar's son dies in hospital. The marriage of the girl happens happily. Naachiyaar kills Vetrivel's friend brutally for revenge. Then the governor comes to Tanjore and CBCID informs that an attempt will be made on governor's life at a Tanjore meeting. Vetrivel is told to protect the governor as he trained for IPS first and was an excellent shooter. But the governor is killed and Vetrivel is framed by the DGP himself. The rest of the film shows how Vetrivel proves himself and again stops another marriage of Annamalai after returning to being a collector.

Cast
 Sundar C. as Vetrivel IAS (Singamuthu)
 Sheryll Brindo as Anjali
 Kiran Rathod as Manjaari
 Vivek as Annamalai, Owner of Annamalai travels
 Prem as Prem
  Akila as Vetrivel sister
 Krishna as Muthu
 Deepa Venkat as Prem's wife
 Thambi Ramaiah
 Raj Kapoor as Minister Vanangamudi
 Pandu Vanangamudi's PA
 Lollu Sabha Manohar Annamalai travels worker
 O. A. K. Sundar as Khedar Pandey
 Thalapathy Dinesh as Dinesh
 Bonda Mani as Annamalai travels worker
 Khushbu (Special appearance)

Soundtrack 

The music was composed by D. Imman and released on Saregama. The soundtrack features a remixed version of the song "Adi Yennadi Raakkamma" from the 1972 movie Pattikada Pattanama, composed by M. S. Viswanathan.

References

External links
 

Films shot in Uttarakhand
2010 films
2010s Tamil-language films
Indian action films
Films directed by A. Venkatesh (director)
2010 action films